Dorina Böczögő (born 15 February 1992 in Orosháza) is a Hungarian artistic gymnast who competed at the 2008 and 2012 Summer Olympics.  She was a member of the team who won bronze at the 2020 European Championships.

Career

2007–2008 
At the 2007 World Championships, Böczögő finished 51st in the all-around with a total score of 55.150. As one of the top nine athletes from a country that had not qualified through team placement, she earned a spot at the 2008 Summer Olympics. At the Olympics, Böczögő finished 52nd in the all-around with a total score of 54.450. She finished 12th on vault, and was just 0.013 away from being a reserve for the vault final. Earlier that year, she competed at the European Championships in Clermont-Ferrand, where the Hungarian team finished in thirteenth. She finished seventeenth in the all-around with a total score of 53.300.

Böczögő competed at several World Cup events in 2008. The first was in Doha in March, where she placed fourth on vault. In April, she competed in Maribor and finished eighth on vault. In May, she finished seventh on vault in Tianjin. The first World Cup medal Böczögő won was a bronze on vault in Szombathely on 4 October 2008. She also finished fifth on bars at that event. Böczögő won her first World Cup gold later that month by scoring a 13.675 on vault in Glasgow. She also finished fourth on beam and floor. She once again won gold on vault in Ostrava. She also won a silver medal on floor with a score of 14.200, which was only 0.050 behind gold medalist Jiang Yuyuan of China. These results qualified Böczögő for the 2008 World Cup Final on vault, where she finished fifth.

2009–2011 
Böczögő won the 2009 Hungarian national all-around title with a 55.700, more than 3.5 points better than second-place Laura Gombás. She won the national titles on vault, uneven bars, and balance beam, and she won silver on floor behind Tünde Csillag. In November, she competed at the Osijek World Cup, where she finished seventh on vault, fifth on uneven bars, and sixth on floor. At the 2009 World Championships, Böczögő finished 30th in the all-around qualification with a 51.750.

In 2010, Böczögő competed on vault, uneven bars, and floor at the European Championships to help the Hungarian team finish twelfth. In September, she competed at the Ghent World Cup finishing fifth on uneven bars and seventh on floor.

2012–13 
At the 2012 Artistic Gymnastics Olympic Test Event, Böczögő and Gombás both qualified to represent Hungary at the 2012 Summer Olympics. However, only one of them could compete, and the NOC decided to send Böczögő. At the 2012 Summer Olympics, Böczögő finished 49th in the all-around with a 50.599.

Böczögő competed at the 2013 European Championships where she placed 22nd in the all-around competition.  She next competed at the 2013 Summer Universiade where she placed 9th in the all-around.

2020-2022 
She was a member of the team who won bronze at the 2020 European Championships. In 2022, she won gold on floor exercise at the World Cup of Cairo, silver at World Cup of Baku, and at the World Cup of Doha. She ranked first overall in the floor exercise in the 2022 World Cup series.

Competitive history

References 

1992 births
Living people
Hungarian female artistic gymnasts
Olympic gymnasts of Hungary
Gymnasts at the 2008 Summer Olympics
Gymnasts at the 2012 Summer Olympics
People from Orosháza
European Games competitors for Hungary
Gymnasts at the 2015 European Games
Sportspeople from Békés County
21st-century Hungarian women